The 1992–93 Slovenian Ice Hockey League was the second season of the Slovenian Hockey League.

At the end of the regular season the playoffs were held. Jesenice were the winners.

Teams
 Bled
 Celje
 Jesenice
 Olimpija
 Slavija
 Triglav Kranj

Standings after regular season

Play-offs

First Part

Semi-finals
Olimpija defeated Celje 3–0 in a best of five series.
Olimpija – Celje 14–1 
Celje – Olimpija 1–7 
Olimpija – Celje 8–5

Jesenice defeated Bled 3–2 in a best of five series.
Jesenice – Bled 2–0 
Bled – Jesenice 4–1 
Jesenice – Bled 5–1 
Bled – Jesenice 5–2
Jesenice – Bled 7–1

Finals
Jesenice defeated Olimpija 4–3 in a best of seven series.
Olimpija – Jesenice 5–2 
Jesenice – Olimpija 5–3 
Olimpija – Jesenice 9–5 
Jesenice – Olimpija 9–6
Olimpija – Jesenice 6–2
Jesenice – Olimpija 4–3
Olimpija – Jesenice 6–7

Third to sixth place

1992–93 in Slovenian ice hockey
Slovenia
Slovenian Ice Hockey League seasons